Valderrama, officially the Municipality of Valderrama, is a 4th class municipality in the province of Antique, Philippines. According to the 2020 census, it has a population of 19,971 people. Making it 15th most populous municipality in the province of Antique and the second largest municipality in terms of land area, with a total area of 273.79 square kilometers.

The area is home to the indigenous Iraynun-Bukidnon, speakers of a dialect of the Kiniray-a language, who have crafted the only rice terrace clusters in the Visayas through indigenous knowledge and sheer vernacular capabilities. The rice terraces of the Iraynun-Bukidnon are divided into three terraced fields, namely, Lublub rice terraces, Baking rice terraces, and San Agustin rice terraces. All of the rice terrace clusters have been researched on by the National Commission for Culture and the Arts and various scholars from the University of the Philippines. There have been campaigns to nominate the Iraynun-Bukidnon Rice Terraces, along with the central Panay mountain range, into the UNESCO World Heritage List.

Etymology
The municipality was named after Spanish governor-general Manuel Blanco Valderrama.

Geography

According to the Philippine Statistics Authority, the municipality has a land area of  constituting  of the  total area of Antique.

Climate

Barangays
Valderrama is politically subdivided into 22 barangays.

Demographics

In the 2020 census, Valderrama had a population of 19,971.

Economy

Government
The newly elected Mayor, Atty. Jocelyn L. Posadas, took her oath on June 21, 2016, after winning the elections May 9, 2016. The new set of the municipality's government officials are Josefino Castillion as Vice Mayor and 8 Sangguniang Bayan (SB) Members: Richel Pagayonan, Pedro Labanon, Jose Mervin Gonzales, Keking Otadoy, Mary Joyce Roquero, Christopher Maguad, Anthony Gade and Budak Pon-an.

References

External links
 [ Philippine Standard Geographic Code]

Municipalities of Antique (province)